Christoph Friedrich von Sacken-Appricken was the Regent of Courland from 1740 to 1758, in modern-day Latvia.

References

External links
World Statesmen.org

Baltic nobility
People from the Duchy of Courland and Semigallia
Place of birth unknown
Place of death unknown
1697 births
1759 deaths